İlhan Berk (18 November 1918 – 28 August 2008) was a leading Turkish poet. He was a dominant figure in the postmodern current in Turkish poetry (termed, "İkinci Yeni"; "The second new generation") and was very influential among Turkish literary circles.<ref>{{cite web|title=İlhan Berk'i kaybettik (Ilhan Berk passes away)|url=http://press.jrc.it/NewsExplorer/clusteredition/tr/20080828,vatanim-7c293762c866edfe6c9b48eafe641d22.html#related_en.|publisher=Europe Media Monitor News Brief|date=2008-08-28|language=tr|url-status=dead|archive-url=https://web.archive.org/web/20120722100510/http://emm.newsexplorer.eu/NewsExplorer/clusteredition/tr/20080828,vatanim-7c293762c866edfe6c9b48eafe641d22.html|archive-date=2012-07-22}}</ref>

Biography
Berk was born in Manisa, Turkey in 1918 and as a child witnessed the Fire of Manisa. He received a teacher's training in Balıkesir. He graduated from the French Language Department of Gazi University in Ankara. Between 1945 and 1955, Berk served as a teacher. He later began to work for the publishing office of Ziraat Bank as a translator (1956–1969). He became specialized in translation of poetry notably by translating into Turkish works by Arthur Rimbaud and Ezra Pound. In his later years, Berk resided in Bodrum where he died on 28 August 2008.

Poetry
Berk's poetry evolved from the approach of an epical socialist to the dreamy vision of a lyrical and erotic individual. He made the "object" visible in its glory and aimed to break down the meaning. Berk's poetry takes its roots from the mythology, and a synthesis of Western and Eastern poetry traditions, yet he accomplishes to create a unique and postmodern approach. Peter Riley, in an analysis of Berk's work published in The Fortnightly Review, suggests the poet sometimes "runs poetry itself to an extremity at which it can no longer function as language."

History, geography, visual arts, cities such as Istanbul, Paris and Ankara, feed Berk's poetry and, his themes are supported by a sizable vocabulary that includes colloquial words as well as very specific ones, such as musical terms and local names of plants.

A significant body of Berk's work is now available in English, most notably A Leaf About To Fall: Selected Poems (2006), Madrigals (2008), The Book of Things (2009) and New selected poems 1947-2008'' (2016); all translated by George Messo.

Bibliography in English

Awards

1979 Turkish Language Association Award
1980 Behçet Necatigil Poetry Award
1983 Yeditepe Poetry Prize
1988 Sedat Simavi Literature Award

See also
 List of contemporary Turkish poets

References

Resources

 

1918 births
2008 deaths
People from Manisa
Turkish male poets
20th-century Turkish poets
20th-century male writers